Freshwater Bayou is a stream in Vermilion Parish, Louisiana.

References

Unincorporated communities in Louisiana
Geography of Vermilion Parish, Louisiana